Hong Chul (born 17 September 1990) is a South Korean football player who plays for Daegu FC and the South Korea national team.

International career
In May 2018 he was named in South Korea's preliminary 28 man squad for the 2018 World Cup in Russia.

Career statistics

Club
As of 26 February 2023

International goals
Scores and results list Korea's goal tally first.

Honours

Club
 Seongnam Ilhwa Chunma
 AFC Champions League: 2010
 FA Cup: 2011

 Suwon Samsung Bluewings
 FA Cup (2): 2016, 2019

 Ulsan Hyundai
 AFC Champions League: 2020

International
South Korea
 EAFF East Asian Cup: 2015

Individual
K League 1 Best XI (4): 2014, 2015, 2018, 2019

References

External links
 Hong Chul – National Team Stats at KFA 

Naver Sports Record 

1990 births
Living people
Association football wingers
Association football fullbacks
South Korean footballers
South Korea under-20 international footballers
South Korea under-23 international footballers
South Korea international footballers
Seongnam FC players
Suwon Samsung Bluewings players
Gimcheon Sangmu FC players
K League 1 players
Dankook University alumni
Footballers at the 2010 Asian Games
Asian Games bronze medalists for South Korea
People from Hwaseong, Gyeonggi
Asian Games medalists in football
Medalists at the 2010 Asian Games
2018 FIFA World Cup players
2019 AFC Asian Cup players
Sportspeople from Gyeonggi Province
2022 FIFA World Cup players